Ali Panik (also Romanized as ‘Ālī Panīk and Ālī Panīk; also known as  ‘Ālī Pīnak, Ālī Pīnak, Ālī Pīnek, and Ālū Pīnek) is a village in Quri Chay Rural District, in the Central District of Dehgolan County, Kurdistan Province, Iran. At the 2006 census, its population was 659, in 148 families. The village is populated by Kurds.

References 

Towns and villages in Dehgolan County
Kurdish settlements in Kurdistan Province